West Independent School District is a school district based in West, Texas United States.

In addition to West, the district serves the towns of Leroy and Ross in northern McLennan County. A small portion of Hill County lies within the district.

History
In 2009, the school district was rated "academically acceptable" by the Texas Education Agency.

On April 17, 2013, an explosion at the West Fertilizer Plant leveled several blocks of West and caused fires to spread across several blocks, including West Middle School. All five schools were shut down for the remaining week.

Schools
West High School (Grades 9-12)
School mascot: Trojan
1963 Class AA girls basketball state champions
1999 Class AAA baseball state champions
2015 Class AAA baseball state champions
2016 Class AAA softball state champions
2016 Class AAA baseball state champions
West Middle School (Grades 6-8)
West Elementary School (Grades PK-5)
Brookhaven Boys Ranch

References

External links
West ISD

School districts in McLennan County, Texas
West, Texas